Sal Tarbut Strauss (Hebrew : "סל תרבות שטראוס" ) is an educational program founded in Israel by Avner Strauss. The program is renowned throughout the Israeli public education system. It offers cultural programming for high school, grade school, and kindergarten children all over Israel.

Sal Tarbut Strauss encompasses five areas of Arts and Culture: 
Drama 
Dance 
Music
Visual Arts
Media Arts and Crafts

Sal Tarbut Strauss has provided cultural enrichment to children since 1987, reaching over three million students, and exposing them to different aspects of music, theater and the visual arts than they would normally encounter.
Most of these programs were approved and recommended by the Ministry of Education, and conformed to their official curriculum.
Sal Tarbut Strauss has independently produced many educational theater shows, working together with the none-profit organization A.V.I.(The Organization for Israeli Stage Arts).

History

Sal Tarbut Strauss began operating in 1987 in Jerusalem, and moved to Tel Aviv around 1990.

In its early years, Sal Tarbut Strauss put an emphasis on introducing students to aspects of American 20th century music that were relatively unfamiliar in Israeli culture.

These include traditional and modern day Blues, Bluegrass, Folk, Jazz, and early Rock and Roll.
Sal Tarbut Strauss has supplied and supported thousands of shows notably thru Strauss Mifaley Tarbut Ltd. Omanut Laam, Sal Tarbut Artzi, Keren Karev, Israeli Ministry of Education, and various other organizations.

The program works all over Israel and reaches the many cities and places where the Israeli Ministry program of artistic and cultural enrichment, run by the Matnasim company Sal Tarbut Artzi does not function.

Goals
Introduction to Art
To present artistic cultural concepts/values to children and teenagers.
To present the main genres and styles in Art.
To present the tools used in art – musical instruments, props, masks and puppets used in theater, basic materials in  plastic arts, cameras in photography and cinema, etc.
Introduction to the tools of art criticism and analysis, aesthetics and forming personal tastes.
Introduction to classic works and the great artists in history and their works.
Workshops and activities that bring children and teenagers together with professionals at the top of their field.

Culture
Getting to know your own cultural identity, getting to know other cultural identities.
Pluralism in art – art is not a barrier between cultures, but a dialogue between cultures that can bring people from different cultures together.

Artistic and cultural enrichment

Creating challenges such as abstract thought, developing the imagination, analytic thought, creativity, etc.
Utilizing art to trigger thinking about societal issues, ecology, environmental issues, violence, the Holocaust, cultural roots, personal commitment, personal hygiene, etc.
Utilizing art to trigger thinking about science, the water cycle in nature, illusions of movement, persistence of vision, fluid mechanics (e.g. communicating vessels), basic properties of materials (hardness, elasticity, flexibility, etc.).

External links

on Sal Tarbut from spoems.com
Sal Tarbut Organization
Sal Tarbut on YouTube
Sal Tarbut's Light Show
Sal Tarbut Strauss - from WN Network. WorldNews

Education in Israel